Huequenia livida is a species of longhorn beetle in the Cerambycinae subfamily. It was described by Germain in 1898. It is known from Chile.

References

Achrysonini
Beetles described in 1898
Endemic fauna of Chile